Chinese phonology is covered by the following articles:
Concerning modern Chinese:
Standard Chinese phonology
Cantonese phonology
For the phonology of other varieties of Chinese, see the articles on the particular varieties
For an overview, see Varieties of Chinese → Phonology

Concerning pre-modern Chinese:
Historical Chinese phonology
Old Chinese phonology